L'ombre du Z, written and drawn by Franquin with Greg and Jidéhem, is the sixteenth album of the Spirou et Fantasio series, and the second part of Franquin's Zorglub diptych. The story was initially serialised in Spirou magazine, before its release as a hardcover album in 1962.

Story
As The Shadow of Z, begins, Spirou, Fantasio and the Count of Champignac return from Zorgland, to find the population of Champignac have been paralyzed by a "zorglman" they left behind sedated, the abducted policeman Jérôme, who awoke and went on a stunning spree. After the ordeal of pacifying the rogue zorglman and restoring the people of Champignac to normal, time passes until Zorglub's sinister schemes again become evident. Without remorse (despite the conscience-burdened act during the conclusion of Z comme Zorglub) Zorglub continues to work for world domination from Palombia, with increased ambition, and allied with Fantasio's evil nemesis cousin Zantafio.

References

 Franquin publications in Spirou BDoubliées

External links
 Spirou official site album index 
 Franquin site album index 

Comics by André Franquin
Spirou et Fantasio albums
1962 graphic novels
1962 in comics
Comics set in South America
Comics set in a fictional country
Works originally published in Spirou (magazine)
Literature first published in serial form